The M275 is a  long, dual three-lane motorway in Hampshire, southern England. It is the principal road route for entering and leaving Portsmouth. It continues as the A3 into Portsmouth, and meets the M27 at its northern terminus. From the motorway, there are scenic views over Portsmouth harbour, and the Sails of the South between the two carriageways.

The M275 is not the responsibility of National Highways. It is managed by Portsmouth City Council from the point where the slip roads to the M27 end. The M275 was not built with a full hard shoulder. For its entire length, a narrow verge is maintained, although there is space available for a full width shoulder. Instead, drivers are warned on entry from the A3 and M27 of the lack of hard shoulder, with signs saying "no hard shoulder for 2miles".

History

The motorway was opened throughout its entire length in 1976. A junction was originally planned for a new development in the Tipner area of Portsmouth, known as the Gateway Project, which was shelved at the time. Before construction was halted, significant work had been carried out, including four incomplete slip roads with no road surfacing, two bridges above the site for the main roundabout, and realignment of Tipner Lane so that it served the roundabout. In 2001, the Sails of the South was unveiled close to the site of the missing junction. In 2005, Portsmouth City Council carried out refurbishments to gantry mounted signs on approach to the M27 junction. New signage was stuck over old signage, and was significantly smaller and disproportionate to the previous layout. Incorrect lane illustrations, lack of adequate route information, and increased difficulty to read at a long distance lead to driver frustration and confusion.

In 2005, the Tipner Gateway Project was resurrected along with plans for a junction. As previously, preparatory works have been carried out for the junction. The latter junction was to be renamed junction 2, with the new Tipner Junction becoming junction 1. Most of the road signs have been replaced and the M27/M275 interchange has been remodelled to make it easier for drivers, including splitting one lane into two, although this has meant that some of the overhead gantry signs are now redundant. Completion of the junction was achieved April 2014. The junction now leads to Tipner West. There is a large park and ride site for over 600 cars alongside the junction.

Junctions
{| class="plainrowheaders wikitable"
|-
!scope=col|County
!scope=col|Location
!scope=col|mi
!scope=col|km
!scope=col|Junction
!scope=col|Destinations
!scope=col|Notes
|-
|rowspan="4"|Hampshire
|rowspan="4"|Portsmouth
|0
|0
|—
|  - Brighton, Southampton 
|
|-
|0.7
|1.2
| bgcolor="ffdddd" |—
| bgcolor="ffdddd" |  - Brighton, Southampton 
| bgcolor="ffdddd" |No northbound entrance from East and no westbound exit from North 
|-
|1.9
|3.1
|1
|Tipner
|
|-
|2.7
|4.4
|2
|  - Portsmouth, Buckland  - Fratton
|

*Ceremonial Counties

Coordinate list

See also
List of motorways in the United Kingdom

References

External links

Portsmouth City Council – M275 Tipner Scheme
Portsmouth City Council – M275 Tipner Updates
Pathetic Motorways – M275

2-0275
Transport in Portsmouth
2-0275